Sharvineh Rural District is a rural district (dehestan) in Kalashi District, Javanrud County, Kermanshah Province, Iran. At the 2006 census, its population was 4,819, in 1,053 families. The rural district has 20 villages.

References 

Rural Districts of Kermanshah Province
Javanrud County